The Georgian Manganese Holding (GMH) is the Georgian subsidiary of the British company Stemcor, producing manganese and ferroalloys. The Georgian Manganese Holding owns JSC Ferro (Zestafoni Ferroalloy Plant) in Zestafoni and Chiaturmanganumi in Chiatura.

See also
 Mining in Georgia (country)

References 

Holding companies of Georgia (country)
Mining companies of Georgia (country)

Manganese mines in Georgia (country)